The 1998–99 Russian Cup was the seventh season of the Russian football knockout tournament since the dissolution of Soviet Union.

Andrey Kobelev played for both eventual finalists during the tournament, captaining FC Dynamo Moscow in their Round of 16 game against FC Alania Vladikavkaz and then transferring to FC Zenit St. Petersburg in the winter and coming on as a substitute for Zenit in the final.

First round
8 May 1998.

Second round
26 May 1998.

27 May 1998.

Third round
6 July 1998.

Fourth round
22 July 1998.

Round of 32
Russian Premier League teams started at this stage.

Round of 16

Quarter-finals

Semi-finals

Final

Played in the earlier stages, but not on the final game roster:

FC Zenit St. Petersburg: Dmitri Davydov (DF), Vasili Kulkov (DF), Alexandru Curtianu  (MF), Oleg Dmitriyev (MF), Serghei Cleşcenco  (FW), Aleksandr Petukhov (FW).

FC Dynamo Moscow: Dmitriy Kramarenko  (GK), Dmytro Tyapushkin  (GK), Deividas Šemberas  (DF), Erik Yakhimovich  (DF), Aleksei Kozlov (DF), Yevgeni Korablyov (DF), Maksim Povorov (DF), Sergei Shtanyuk  (DF), Sergei Nekrasov (DF), Andrei Gordeyev (MF), Vladimir Skokov (MF), Andrey Kobelev (MF), Tomas Danilevičius  (FW).

References

Russian Cup seasons
Russian Cup
Cup
Cup